Gregory Jbara (born September 28, 1961) is an American film, television, and stage actor, and a singer.

Early life and education
Jbara was born in Nankin Township (now Westland), Michigan, the son of an advertising office manager and an insurance claims adjuster. He is of Lebanese and Irish descent. After graduating from Wayne Memorial High School in Wayne, Michigan, Jbara attended the University of Michigan from 1979 to 1981. He majored in Communication Studies and took classes in Theatre and Musical Theatre. He left Michigan to attend the Juilliard School's drama division (1982–1986, Group 15), where he received his Bachelor of Fine Arts degree.

Both of Jbara's brothers also have careers in the entertainment industry. Mike, formerly President and CEO, WEA Corp., was named President of Alternative Distribution Alliance worldwide in June 2013. Brother Dan has made his career primarily as a reality show producer. Jbara also has a sister, Judy, who is Director of Client Relations for Beer Financial Group.

Career
Jbara originated the role of "Jackie Elliot" (known as "Dad") in the Broadway production of Billy Elliot the Musical, which opened on November 13, 2008.  For his portrayal of "Dad," Jbara received the Outer Critics Circle, Drama Desk, and Tony awards for Best Featured Actor in a Musical during the 2008-2009 Broadway awards season.

On May 5, 2005, Sardi's caricatures of Dirty Rotten Scoundrels stars Butz, Gleason, Jbara and Scott were unveiled in a ceremony hosted by fellow co-star Sara Gettelfinger. (Scoundrels star John Lithgow had already been caricatured at Sardi's.) In a 2008 Grand Rapids Press interview, Jbara (noting the importance of being caricatured at the landmark Broadway restaurant) said, "You don't remember a year later who won the Tonys, but  that picture will be in Sardi's for the rest of my life."

Jbara received the BackStageWest Garland 2000 Award for his performance in the West Coast premiere of George Furth's play Precious Sons, co-starring Nora Dunn, Michael Malota, Ginger Williams and Adam Wylie.

In 2006, Jbara received a Special Award from the New England Theatre Conference for his achievement in theatre.

Jbara appeared as TV Land's on-camera spokesperson in eight different spots featuring three generations sitting on a couch: grandpa (William Severs), father/boomer (Jbara) and teenage son (Dylan Kepp). The spots focused, humorously, on the contrasts among those generations and were first shown on TV Land during the TV Land Awards broadcast on April 22, 2007.

Jbara's most prominent TV roles to date have been as Dan O'Keefe in the Fox/WB sitcom Grounded for Life (2002–05), and as NYPD Deputy Commissioner of Public Information Garrett Moore on the CBS drama Blue Bloods (2010–present).

Broadway credits
 "Dad" in Billy Elliot the Musical (2008) (originated role)
 "André Thibault" in Dirty Rotten Scoundrels (2005) (originated role)
 "Billy Flynn" in Chicago (revival)
 "Squash (Mr. Bernstein)" in Victor/Victoria (1995) (originated role)
 "Sohovik" in Damn Yankees (1994) (revival; originated role)
 "Bellhop #1/Bootblack" in Born Yesterday (1989) with Ed Asner and Madeline Kahn (Broadway revival)
 "LIFFE Trader, John" in Serious Money (1988) with Alec Baldwin and Kate Nelligan (Jbara's Broadway debut)

Other selected stage credits
 "Mr. Bunder" in the West Coast Premiere of Michael John LaChiusa's play, Little Fish (2007) starring Alice Ripley
 "Vinnie" in the Geffen Playhouse Premier of Neil Simon's Oscar and Felix (update to The Odd Couple)
 "Ike/Bess Truman" in the West Coast Premiere of Michael John LaChiusa's play, First Lady Suite
 "Clark Gable" in The Blank Theatre Company's The Living Room Series presentation of Mark Saltzman's new play, Mr. Shaw Goes To Hollywood
 "Chick Clark" in Wonderful Town (2000) for City Center Encores!
 "Kevin Cartwright" in Privates On Parade (1989) with Jim Dale and Simon Jones
 "Smudge" in Forever Plaid
 "Gunther, Wotan, Hagen, Dwarf, Giant" in Das Barbecü (Goodspeed Opera House, East Haddam, Connecticut)
 "The Frankenstein Monster" in Have I Got A Girl For You! (Jbara's Off-Broadway debut)

Selected TV credits
 "Roy" in Newhart episode, "Fun with Dick and Joanna"
 Bartender in Frasier episode, "Shutout in Seattle: Part 2"
 "DCPI Garrett Moore" (recurring role) in Blue Bloods
 "Mr. Finn" in Nurse Jackie episode, "Game On"
 "Oscar Newton" in Law & Order episode, "Brilliant Disguise"
 "Stan Lawrence" in Monk episode, "Mr. Monk Gets Lotto Fever"
 "German General," "German Soldier," and "German Priest" in Family Guy episode, "Road to Germany"
 "Col. Roger Bright" in The Unit episode, "Paradise Lost"
 "Judge Herman Zemit" in Conviction episode, "True Love"
 "The Tree Trimmer Hero" (voice) in Higglytown Heroes episode, "Kip Gets Swing Fever" 2005
 "Himself/narrator" in Ripley's Believe It or Not! 2000-2003
 "Dan O'Keefe" (recurring role) in Grounded for Life (Seasons 2-5)
 "George Haan" in Century City episode, "Sweet Child of Mine"
 "Gene Lester" ("Pyramid" contestant) in Friends episode, "The One Where the Stripper Cries"
 "Congressman Segal" in The West Wing episode, "Angel Maintenance"
 "Rev. Compton" in Ally McBeal episode, "Reach Out and Touch"
 "Mike" in Malcolm in the Middle episode, "New Neighbors"
 "Jo Jo Regosi" (recurring role) in That's Life
 "Scott Morgan" in Touched by an Angel episode, "At the End of the Aisle"
 "Director Greg" in Come on Over episode, "Welcome to the Theatre"

Selected film credits
 "Les Hirsch" in Remember Me  (2010) (with Robert Pattinson)
 "Jack" in Out of Step (written and directed by Eileen Connors)
 "Jerry Yarbro" in Exit Speed (with David Rees Snell, Lea Thompson, and Fred Ward)
 "Hank Messinger" in The First $20 Million Is Always the Hardest (2002) (with Adam Garcia, Enrico Colantoni and Ethan Suplee)
 "Snug the Joiner" in A Midsummer Night's Dream  (1999) (with Kevin Kline)
 "Edward" in The Out-of-Towners (1999) (with Steve Martin and Goldie Hawn)
 "Walter Brackett" in In & Out (1997) (with Kevin Kline)
 "Angelique Marcangelo" in Jeffrey (1995) (with Steven Weber and Patrick Stewart)
 Home on the Range (2004) as Chrous/The Willie Brother #3’s singing voice
 Broken City (2013)
 The Mice War (2018) as General Kan (voice)

Miscellaneous credits
 "Audio-animatronic Radio Newscaster" for Spaceship Earth (The Age of Information scene; character announces Amelia Earhart's flight across the Atlantic)
 "Husband out dancing with wife" in  multi-media ad campaign for Caduet which launched April 2008 (internet, television, print)
 "Dad of college student" in TV ad for Olive Garden Mezzalunas

References

External links
 Official Site: GregoryJbara.com
 Broadway.com: Backstage at Billy Elliot With Billy's Dad Starring Gregory Jbara
 
 
 Voice Actor Profile: VoiceChasers.com 
 Gregory Jbara at the Internet Off-Broadway Database

1961 births
Living people
People from Westland, Michigan
American people of Lebanese descent
Male actors from Michigan
American male film actors
American male musical theatre actors
American male television actors
American male voice actors
American people of Irish descent
Drama Desk Award winners
Juilliard School alumni
University of Michigan School of Music, Theatre & Dance alumni
Tony Award winners